Santa Ana is a seaside resort in Colonia Department, Uruguay, near the capital city of Colonia del Sacramento.

References

External links 

Populated places in the Colonia Department
Seaside resorts in Uruguay